Maulvi Muhammad Ali Jan Ahmad is an Afghan Taliban politician who is currently serving as Governor of Paktia province since 7 November 2021. He has also served as Governor of Logar province from August 2021 to 6 November 2021.

References

Living people
Year of birth missing (living people)
Taliban governors
Governors of Paktia Province
Governors of Logar Province